World of Dragon Warrior: Torneko: The Last Hope is a role-playing video game for the PlayStation. The game was co-developed by Chunsoft and Matrix Software and published by Enix in both Japan and North America in 1999 and 2000 respectively. In Japan, the game was ported to the Game Boy Advance in 2001.

Torneko: The Last Hope is a spin-off title of the Dragon Quest franchise and the second Mystery Dungeon game to star the Dragon Quest IV character Torneko. It is also the second game in the Mystery Dungeon series to be released in North America, after Chocobo's Dungeon 2. Like in Torneko no Daibōken: Fushigi no Dungeon, Torneko (or Taloon, as he was known in Dragon Warrior IV) explores dungeons in search of items, while fighting hordes of monsters.

Gameplay
The game is done with two dimensional graphics and an overhead perspective of the games activities. The main gameplay involves Torneko exploring mazelike dungeons in search of items. When players first start conquering dungeons, Torneko continuously returns to level one strength and loses all his items until he rebuilds his storehouse. Temporary saves are sometimes allowed mid-dungeon, but these are erased as soon as players resume play. Combat against monsters is turn-based, with player and enemies alternating movements and actions. Torneko can attack with close range weapons like swords, long range like bow and arrow, or magic spells summoned with a wand or scroll. Torneko also has a hunger meter which causes him to lose health if he does not eat bread. During his exploration, Torneko can discover treasure and magic items.

Plot
The plot for Torneko: The Last Hope happens after the events of Dragon Quest IV, and half a year after Torneko no Daibōken: Fushigi no Dungeon. Torneko returns to his village and is forced to help cure his village of a curse that has been placed upon it.

Development
On April 18, 2000, Enix announced its first three games to be made for the original PlayStation, of which Torneko: The Last Hope was one. The game features 130 hand drawn monsters.

A 2013 news article wrote that based on forum posts by Nob Ogasawara, one of the game's editors, The Last Hope was only localized in the United States because of the passion of the translation team and their agreement to work for much less than normal. In a 2020 interview, Ogasawara clarified that the localization team largely consisted of himself; according to him, the original translation company "made a total mess of things", produced no usable text, and wasted most of the budget and deadline, so he personally with his editor and kids finished the work in three weeks.

Music
The musical score for Torneko: The Last Hope was composed by Dragon Quest series composer, Koichi Sugiyama. The original game soundtrack from the PlayStation version was released by SPE Visual Works on January 21, 2000, in Japan on a single 21-track disc.

Reception

Torneko: The Last Hope was a financial and critical success in Japan. The PlayStation version of the game sold over 578,000 units in Japan the year of its release. The Game Boy Advance version of the game had sold over 181,000 units in Japan by 2007. Famitsu gave the game a score of 37 out of 40 for the PS version, and all four nines for a total of 36 out of 40 for the GBA version. Additionally, the game was voted by the publication as number 31 in its top 100 PlayStation games of all time. The game was also nominated for “Game of the Year” by CESA.

The PlayStation version of Torneko: The Last Hope did not sell well in North America and received "average" reviews according to the review aggregation website Metacritic. RPGFan called the game "frustratingly difficult," but said that its "addictive gameplay elements and top-notch soundtrack" make it a marvelous game. Jeff Gerstmann of GameSpot said that a lot of role-playing game players would be turned off by its lack of story and randomly generated dungeons, but those who are looking for some lighter fare of role-playing game may like it. Other critics scored the game much lower, however. Erik Reppen of Game Informer called it "an outdated, ugly piece of crap whose silly antics will charm no one. There are so many better RPGs out there." Eric Bratcher of NextGen called it "A primitive, turn-based dungeon crawler that takes so many cheap shots it could tick off a Buddhist monk." Mikel Tidwell of RPGamer called the game simple but fun, and it was mostly for those who already like rogue like games with randomized dungeons. He did, however, find the game to have amusing dialogue and the music for each dungeon matches it “remarkably well”.

Notes

References

External links
Official Torneko site

Role-playing video games
Chunsoft games
Game Boy Advance games
PlayStation (console) games
Matrix Software games
1999 video games
Roguelike video games
Video games developed in Japan
Video games scored by Koichi Sugiyama
Video games using procedural generation
Mystery Dungeon
Single-player video games
Dragon Quest spin-off games